Georg Baumann (1 September 1892 – before 19 February 1934) was an Estonian wrestler who competed for the Russian Empire, and was world champion in Greco-Roman wrestling.

Biography
He competed in the Greco-Roman lightweight competition along with two other Estonians, August Kippasto and Oskar Kaplur, at the 1912 Summer Olympics in Stockholm, where he was eliminated after losing against later winner Emil Väre and Johan Alfred Salonen.

He was the lightweight class World champion at the 1913 Wrestling World Championships in Breslau. In the same year he won a gold in Russian Olympiad and he was awarded the title Best Amateur Wrestler of the Baltic States. Although some sources claim that he was killed during World War I there are reports of him moving to China in 1922 where he worked as wrestler and circus artist. His death was reported in Russian language Chinese newspaper Shanghaiskaya Zarya on 19 February 1934.

See also
List of people who disappeared

References

External links
 
 Profile at FILA Wrestling Database

1892 births
1930s missing person cases
Estonian male sport wrestlers
Missing person cases in China
Olympic wrestlers of Russia
People declared dead in absentia
Place of death unknown
Russian male sport wrestlers
World Wrestling Championships medalists
Wrestlers at the 1912 Summer Olympics
Year of death missing